Daci Temple is a Buddhist temple located in Chengdu, Sichuan.

History

Wei and Jin dynasties
The original temple dates back to the 3rd century. According to Wu Deng Hui Yuan, in the Wei and Jin dynasties, Indian Buddhist monk Baozhang came to Sichuan to worship Samantabhadra and lived in Da'ci Temple.

Tang dynasty
In 622, during the Tang dynasty (618–907), Xuanzang (602–664) received full ordination at Daci Temple. In 756, An Lushan (703–757) seized the capital city Chang'an, Emperor Xuanzong (685–762) was evacuated to Chengdu. When he saw monks of Daci Temple giving food to the poor in the street, he was deeply moved and inscribed and honored the name "Dashengci Temple". Emperor Xuanzong issued the decree to rebuild the temple. Master Wuxiang, a prince of Silla, supervised the reconstruction of the temple. In 822, Master Zhixuan settled at the temple to deliver Buddhist precepts there, and attracted large numbers of practitioners. Emperor Wuzong of Tang (814–846) ordered to demolish Buddhist temples, confiscate temple lands and force monks to return to secular life. Because the temple had the handwriting of the former Emperor Xuanzong, it was exceptionally retained and became the only Buddhist temple in the area.

Song dynasty
In the Southern Song dynasty (1127–1279), Lanxi Daolong (1213–1278) received ordination as a monk at the temple. In 1246, he took his disciples to Japan, and founded the Kenchō-ji sect in Japan.

Ming dynasty
In 1435, in the 10th year of Xuande period (1399–1435) in the Ming dynasty (1368–1644), a disastrous fire destroyed most of the buildings.

Qing dynasty
Daci Temple was reconstructed during the Shunzhi era (1368–1661) of the Qing dynasty (1644–1911). It was renovated and refurbished in 1867, during the reign of Tongzhi Emperor (1856–1875).

People's Republic of China
After the 3rd Plenary Session of the 11th Central Committee of the Communist Party of China, the policy of religious freedom was implemented. Daci Temple was classified as a municipal-level cultural heritage in Chengdu. It was used as a location for Chengdu Museum, which opened in 1984. At the end of 2003, Daci Temple was restored and was officially opened to the public on April 8 of the following year. On June 25, 2005, monk Da'en was proposed as the new abbot of the temple. The low-rise Sino-Ocean Taikoo Li Chengdu complex which opened in April 2015 was built surrounding the temple in keeping with traditional Sichuan architecture.

References

Buddhist temples in Chengdu
Tourist attractions in Chengdu
19th-century establishments in China
19th-century Buddhist temples
Religious buildings and structures completed in 1867